Abertillery was a county constituency centred on the town of Abertillery in Monmouthshire.  It returned one Member of Parliament (MP) to the House of Commons of the Parliament of the United Kingdom, elected by the first past the post system of election. From 1950 up to (and including) 1970, it was the safest Labour seat in the United Kingdom.

The constituency was created for the 1918 general election, and abolished for the 1983 general election.

Boundaries
The constituency consisted of the urban districts of Abercarn, Abertillery and Nantyglo and Blaina.

Members of Parliament

Elections

Elections in the 1910s

Elections in the 1920s

Elections in the 1930s 

General Election 1939–40:

Another General Election was required to take place before the end of 1940. The political parties had been making preparations for an election to take place and by the Autumn of 1939, the following candidates had been selected; 
Labour: George Daggar
Conservative:

Elections in the 1940s

Elections in the 1950s

Elections in the 1960s

Elections in the 1970s

References

 

History of Monmouthshire
Historic parliamentary constituencies in South Wales
Constituencies of the Parliament of the United Kingdom established in 1918
Constituencies of the Parliament of the United Kingdom disestablished in 1983
Politics of Monmouthshire
Abertillery